Epiblema may refer to:
 Epiblema (moth), an insect genus in the family Tortricidae
 Epiblema (plant), a plant genus in the family Orchidaceae